Patrick Wayne O'Reilly (May 1, 1925 – May 1, 2020) was an American lawyer and politician.

O'Reilly was born in Hugo, Oklahoma, In 1932, O'Reilly moved with his family to Arizona and eventually settled in Wickenburg, Arizona. He graduated from the Wickenburg High School and then was involved with the mining and railroad businesses. O'Reilly served in the United States Navy during World War II. O'Reilly then received his bachelor's and law degrees from the University of Arizona. He practiced law in Phoenix, Arizona. O'Reilly served in the Arizona House of Representatives in 1955 and 1956 as a Democrat. He died in Phoenix, Arizona.

Notes

1925 births
2020 deaths
People from Hugo, Oklahoma
People from Wickenburg, Arizona
Politicians from Phoenix, Arizona
Lawyers from Phoenix, Arizona
Military personnel from Arizona
University of Arizona alumni
Democratic Party members of the Arizona House of Representatives
United States Navy personnel of World War II